Whatever... is the second album of material from Greek-Australian comic character, Guido Hatzis. The album is a compilation of prank call segments from the Triple M radio show, CRUD. The album was released in November 2000 and peaked at number 8 on the ARIA Charts and was certified platinum.

At the ARIA Music Awards of 2001 the album won the ARIA Award for Best Comedy Release.

Track listing
 Disc 1 - Guido v Skippy Land	
 "Rent... Geoff Speaking" - 2:16
 "Clothes Shop" - 2:42
 "Mobile Phones" - 1:00
 "Guido Class" - 2:27
 "Restaurant Review" - 0:25
 "Full Body Wax" - 1:42
 "Mechanic" - 1:05
 "Florist" - 0:44
 "Florist 2" - 0:10
 "Mayor Guido" - 2:03
 "Shared House" - 1:31
 "Shared House 2" - 0:15
 "Telemarketing" - 2:16
 "Owner / Driver" - 0:52
 "Owner / Driver 2" - 0:27
 "Name Change" - 2:09
 "University Degree" - 1:08
 "Baker" - 0:17
 "Baker 2" - 0:44
 "Supermarket" - 1:28
 "Clown" - 2:08
 "Paperboy" - 1:29
 "Number Plate" - 1:21
 "Refuge" - 1:19
 "Telemarketing 2" - 2:13
 "Hotel Reservations" - 1:09
 "Flowers" - 1:08
 "Helicopter" - 1:30
 "The Pretender" - 4:33

 Disc 2 - Guido v The World	
 "Danny Boy" (Ireland) - 0:32
 "Danny Boy 2" (Ireland) - 0:47
 "Irish Eyes Are Drooling" (Ireland) - 1:59	
 "Tokyo Shock Boys" (Japan) - 2:06
 "Moccassins" (Japan) - 1:28	
 "Pink Ponchos" (Mexico) - 0:27
 "Pink Ponchos 2" (Mexico) - 1:10
 "Coin of the Realm" (Canada) - 0:30
 "Green Berets" (USA) - 1:32
 "Clan Reunion 1" (Scotland) -	0:36
 "Clan Reunion 2" (Scotland) -	0:56
 "Echo" (Korea) - 0:50
 "2 Litres" (Korea) - 2:03
 "Dogs Playing Poker" (France) - 1:30
 "Arabian Nights" (Egypt) - 1:08

Charts

Weekly charts

Year-end charts

Certifications

References 

2000 albums
ARIA Award-winning albums